An Auth-Code, also known as an EPP code, authorization code, transfer code, or Auth-Info Code, is a generated passcode required to transfer an Internet domain name between domain registrars; the code is intended to indicate that the domain name owner has authorized the transfer.

Auth-Codes are created by the current registrar of the domain.  The registrar is required to provide the Auth-Code to the domain name owner within five calendar days of the owner's request, and ICANN accepts complaints about registrars that do not.  Some registrars allow Auth-Codes to be generated by the domain owners through the registrar's website.

Alternative systems
The .nz domain registry uses an eight-digit Unique Domain Authentication Identifier (UDAI) for domain transfers and name conflict procedures.  The UDAI is provided to the domain owner by the domain's current registrar, and expires after 30 days.

The .uk and .co.uk domain registry, instead of using a passcode, has the domain owner specify the new registrar using the old registrar.  The destination registrar is specified using the destination's registrar tag, also known as an Internet Provider Security (IPS) tag or Nominet Provider tag.

See also
 Domain lock — another attribute of a domain registration to prevent unauthorized domain transfers and other domain name scams
 Extensible Provisioning Protocol (EPP) — protocol used by a large number of domain registries and registrars to communicate domain changes

References

Computer access control
Domain Name System